The Gugera Branch Canal originates from the Lower Chenab Canal. The main areas to which it supplies water are Toba Tek Singh and Faisalabad in Punjab province of Pakistan. It iis named after Gogera that was district at that time.

See also
 Head Khanki
 Lower Chenab
 Jhang Branch
 Marala Headworks
 Taunsa Barrage
 Indus River
 Rachna Doab
 Gugera

References

Canals in Pakistan